The eighth and final season of Laverne & Shirley, an American television sitcom series, began airing on September 28, 1982 on ABC. The season concluded on May 10, 1983 after 22 episodes.

The season aired Tuesdays at 8:30-9:00 pm (EST). It ranked 25th among television programs and garnered a 17.8 rating. The entire season was released on DVD in North America on May 6, 2014.

Overview
The series had revolved around the longtime friends Laverne DeFazio and Shirley Feeney, although there was to be a massive change early in this season with several cast members departing the series. Shirley (Cindy Williams) permanently leaves the show after episode 2.  The character of Shirley marries and moves away, leaving Laverne on her own.  Despite this, the show is still titled Laverne & Shirley. Lenny (Michael McKean) was also demoted from the main cast as McKean took time off to film This Is Spinal Tap; he would remain a recurring character, appearing in five episodes. Edna, a regular since season 2, was written out after actress Betty Garrett had committed to another show.  The character is said to have left Frank DeFazio, Laverne's father.

The changes left Laverne and Squiggy (David Lander) as the two main leads. The season is set in 1967, remaining (as the show had been since season 6) set in Burbank, California.

Cast

Penny Marshall as Laverne DeFazio
David Lander as Andrew "Squiggy" Squiggman
Phil Foster as Frank DeFazio
Eddie Mekka as Carmine Ragusa
Leslie Easterbrook as Rhonda Lee

Guest appearances
Cindy Williams as Shirley Feeney 
Michael McKean as Leonard "Lenny" Kosnowski

Episodes

References

Laverne & Shirley seasons
1982 American television seasons
1983 American television seasons